Not to be confused with Lunsemfwa Hydroelectric Power Station (18 MW)

Lunsemfwa Lower Hydroelectric Power Station, is a planned  hydroelectric power station in Zambia. The power station is under development by a consortium comprising Lunsemfwa Hydro Power Company (LHPC), a Zambian independent power producer and EleQtra, a United Kingdom-based financial and development company. The off-taker is planned to be Zambia Electricity Supply Corporation Limited (ZESCO), the national electricity utility parastatal company.

Location
The power station would be located across the Lunsemfwa River, in Zambia's Central Province, downstream of the 40 MW Mulungushi Hydroelectric Power Station and the 18 MW Lunsemfwa Hydroelectric Power Station.

Overview
The design calls for generation capacity of 255 megawatts. the power station is planned as a run of river project, without a large reservoir. The 1,630 GWh generated here annually are expected to be purchased by ZESCO for integration into the Zambian national grid.

Developers
As far back as 2010, Lunsemfwa Hydro Power Company and InfraCo Africa Limited, planned to develop a power station on the Lunsemfwa River. At that time, a 120 MW project was anticipated at a projected cost of between US$220 million and US$275 million. Eleven years later, a 255 MW plant is planned with InfraCo passing the responsibility to her subsidiary EleQtra. The owner remains LHPC.

Cost and timeline
The cost of construction is reported as approximately US$300 million. Construction is expected to start in 2023 and last approximately three years.

See also

Zambezi River
List of power stations in Zambia

References

External links
  Lungu orders solution for Upper Lunsemfwa Dam As of 18 June 2017.
  Low power production at Lunsemfwa attributed to US$50m ZESCO debt As of 25 June 2020.

Hydroelectric power stations in Zambia
Central Province, Zambia
Buildings and structures in Zambia